Xingyang, is a county-level city of Henan Province, South Central China, it is under the administration of the prefecture-level city of Zhengzhou. It is situated 15 kilometers to the west of Zhengzhou city proper.

Administration
The county-level city of Xingyang administers 16 township-level divisions, including 2 sub-districts , 9 towns, 2 townships, 1 ethnic township and 1 landscape division.
Subdistricts
 Suohe Subdistrict
 Jingcheng Subdistrict

Towns
 Qiaolou Town
 Yulong Town
 Guanwu Town
 Wangcun Town
 Sishui Town
 Gaoshan Town
 Liuhe Town
 Cuimiao Town
 Jiayu Town

Townships
 Chengguan Township
 Gaocun Township
 Beimang Township

Ethnic townships
 Jinzhai Hui Ethnic Township

Climate

History
The name of Xingyang, coming from Shangshu, means the city located in the north of Xing River. The history of Xingyang can be retrieved in books written more than 3,000 years ago.

It is believed in Chinese legend that Xingyang is the place where Chang'e flew to the Moon. In addition, many influential persons in Chinese history were from Xingyang, such as Shen Buhai, a legalist in the Warring States period) and Li Shangyin (a poet in late Tang Dynasty). Moreover, Xingyang is considered as the origin place of the people whose surname is Zheng in the world.

Xingyang is home to remains from the Han dynasty.

Buddhist antiquities have been found there.

Economy
In 2004 the GDP is ¥ 14.5 Billion, and the GDP per capita is ¥ 23,387.

Located on the flat southern bank of the Yellow River, Xingyang's Wangcun Town is known for its aquaculture. Since their development started in 1986, the pond systems in Wangcun have grown to the total size of 15,000 mu (10 km2), making the town the largest aquaculture center in North China.

In 2007, construction started in Wangcun on a large turtle farm raising the Yellow River Turtle (a local variety of the Chinese softshell turtle). With the capacity for raising 5 million turtles a year, the facility was expected to become Henan's largest farm of this kind.

Transportation
Travelling within the city is convenient and cheap by bus or taxi. In 2005, the start fee of Taxi for the first 3 kilometres is about ¥ 4, and the cost for every additional kilometre is ¥ 1. Fares are generally somewhat higher during 10 pm to 6 am. Normally ¥ 6-7 is maximum for traveling in the city Xingyang. The Zhengzhou West Railway Station is located in Xingyang.

Tourist attractions
Chuhehanjie (or Hong Gou) is a famous place in early Western Han Dynasty where Liu Bang, the creator of Western Han Dynasty, fought for years with his rival, Xiang Yu. Because none of them could win after years, they decided to use the Chuhehanjie to divide China into two parts, with the eastern part to Xiang Yu and western part to Liu Bang after negotiation. Liu Bang broke this agreement later when Xiang Yu retreated from Xingyang to rescue the capital of his territory, which was attacked by Han Xin. The border between the two is commonly referenced in Xiangqi (i.e., Chinese chess) as the symbolic divider between the two sides of a game board.
Hulao Pass is an important site in Three Kingdoms Period where Lü Bu fought with Liu Bei, Guan Yu, and Zhang Fei.
The Ruins of Yangshao civilization
Huancuiyu Landscape area

Agricultural products
 Xingyang dried persimmon
 Guangwu Megranate

Notable residents
The hometown of the character Zheng (T: 鄭, S: 郑) from The Tale of Li Wa is Xingyang.

References

External links
Official website of Xingyang Government 

County-level divisions of Henan
Zhengzhou
Cities in Henan